Electoral history of Theodore Roosevelt, who served as the 26th president of the United States (1901–1909), the 25th vice president (1901), and the 33rd governor of New York (1899–1900).

Mayoral elections

Gubernatorial elections
New York gubernatorial race, 1898
New York gubernatorial election, 1898

 Theodore Roosevelt/Timothy L. Woodruff (R) - 661,715 (49.09%)
 Augustus Van Wyck/Elliott Danforth (D) - 643,921 (47.77%)
 Benjamin Hanford (Socialist) - 23,860 (1.77%)
 John Kline (Prohibition) - 18,383 (1.36%)

Vice presidential nomination
Vice Presidential race, 1900
1900 Republican National Convention (Vice Presidential tally):

 Theodore Roosevelt - 925 (99.89%)
 Abstaining - 1 (0.11%)

1900 United States presidential election:
 William McKinley/Theodore Roosevelt (R) - 7,228,864 (51.6%) and 292 electoral votes (65.32%, 28 states carried)
 William Jennings Bryan/Adlai E. Stevenson I (D) - 6,370,932 (45.5%) and 155 electoral votes (34.68%, 17 states carried)
 John Granville Woolley/Henry Brewer Metcalf (Prohibition) - 210,864 (1.5%)
 Eugene V. Debs/Job Harriman (Socialist) - 87,945 (0.6%)
 Wharton Barker/Ignatius L. Donnelly (Populist) - 50,989 (0.4%)
 Joseph Francis Maloney/Valentine Remmel (Socialist Labor) - 40,943 (0.3%)
 Others - 6,889 (0.0%)

Presidential races, 1904-1916
1904 Republican National Convention (Presidential tally)

 Theodore Roosevelt (inc.) - 994 (100.00%)

1904 United States presidential election:
 Theodore Roosevelt/Charles W. Fairbanks (R) - 7,630,457 (56.4%) and 336 electoral votes (70.59%, 32 states carried)
 Alton B. Parker/Henry G. Davis (D) - 5,083,880 (37.6%) and 140 electoral votes (29.41%, 13 states carried)
 Eugene V. Debs/Benjamin Hanford (Socialist) - 402,810 (3.0%)
 Silas C. Swallow/George W. Carroll (Prohibition) - 259,102 (1.9%)
 Thomas E. Watson/Thomas Tibbles (Populist) - 114,070 (0.8%)
 Charles Hunter Corregan/William Wesley Cox (Socialist Labor) - 33,454 (0.2%)
 Others - 1,229 (0.0%)

1908 Republican National Convention (Presidential tally):
 William Howard Taft - 702 (71.63%)
 Philander C. Knox - 68 (6.94%)
 Charles Evans Hughes - 67 (6.84%)
 Joseph Gurney Cannon - 58 (5.92%)
 Charles W. Fairbanks - 40 (4.08%)
 Robert M. La Follette, Sr. - 25 (2.55%)
 Joseph B. Foraker - 16 (1.63%)
 Theodore Roosevelt (inc.) - 3 (0.31%)
 Abstaining - 1 (0.10%)

1911 New York Republican Senate caucus:

 Chauncey M. DePew (inc.) - 58 (87.88%)
 E. H. Butler - 2 (3.03%)
 Theodore Roosevelt - 2 (3.03%)
 L. A. Grace - 1 (1.52%)
 Seth Low - 1 (1.52%)
 George L. Meade - 1 (1.52%)
 Andrew D. White - 1 (1.52%)

1912 Republican presidential primaries:

 Theodore Roosevelt - 1,183,238 (51.14%)
 William Howard Taft (inc.) - 800,441 (34.59%)
 Robert M. La Follette, Sr. - 327,357 (14.15%)
 Robert G. Ross - 605 (0.03%)
 Charles Evans Hughes - 13 (0.00%)
 Others - 2,193 (0.10%)

1912 Republican National Convention (Presidential tally):

 William Howard Taft (inc.) - 556 (51.58%)
 Abstaining - 355 (32.93%)
 Theodore Roosevelt - 107 (9.93%)
 Robert M. La Follette, Sr. - 41 (3.80%)
 Albert B. Cummins - 17 (1.58%)
 Charles Evans Hughes - 2 (0.19%)

1912 Progressive National Convention:

 Theodore Roosevelt - unanimously

1912 United States presidential election:
 Woodrow Wilson/Thomas R. Marshall (D) - 6,296,284 (41.8%) and 435 electoral votes (81.92%, 40 states carried)
 Theodore Roosevelt/Hiram W. Johnson (Progressive) - 4,122,721 (27.4%) and 88 electoral votes (16.57%, 6 states carried)
 William Howard Taft/Nicholas M. Butler (R) - 3,486,242 (23.2%) and 8 electoral votes (1.51%, 2 states carried)
 Eugene V. Debs/Emil Seidel (Socialist) - 901,551 (6.0%)
 Eugene Wilder Chafin/Aaron Sherman Watkins (Prohibition) - 208,156 (1.4%)
 Arthur Elmer Reimer/August Gilhaus (Socialist Labor) - 29,324 (0.2%)
 Others - 4,556 (0.0%)

1916 Progressive presidential primaries:

 Theodore Roosevelt - 5,152 (71.12%)
 Charles Evans Hughes - 10 (0.14%)
 Lawrence Sherman - 10 (0.14%)
 Others - 2,072 (28.60%)

1916 Republican presidential primaries:

 Unpledged delegates - 455,765 (23.60%)
 Martin G. Brumbaugh - 233,100 (12.07%)
 Albert B. Cummins - 191,951 (9.94%)
 Charles W. Fairbanks - 176,080 (9.12%)
 Lawrence Sherman - 155,945 (8.07%)
 Robert M. La Follette, Sr. - 133,476 (6.91%)
 Henry Ford - 131,965 (6.83%)
 Theodore Elijah Burton - 122,169 (6.33%)
 Theodore Roosevelt - 83,739 (4.34%)
 Charles Evans Hughes - 82,530 (4.27%)
 William Alden Smith - 77,872 (4.03%)
 Henry D. Estabrook - 30,676 (1.59%)
 William Grant Webster - 17,927 (0.93%)
 William O. Simpson - 14,365 (0.74%)

1916 Progressive National Convention:

 Theodore Roosevelt - unanimously

1916 Republican National Convention:

1st ballot:
 Charles Evans Hughes - 253.5
 John W. Weeks - 105
 Elihu Root - 103
 Albert B. Cummins - 85
 Charles W. Fairbanks - 74.5
 Theodore E. Burton - 77.5
 Theodore Roosevelt - 65
 Philander C. Knox - 36
 Henry Ford - 32
 Martin G. Brumbaugh - 29
 Robert M. La Follette - 25
 Others - 25

2nd ballot:
 Charles Evans Hughes - 328.5
 Elihu Root - 98.5
 Charles W. Fairbanks - 88.5
 Albert W. Cummins - 85
 Theodore Roosevelt - 81
 John W. Weeks - 79
 Theodore E. Burton - 76.5
 Philander C. Knox - 36
 Robert M. La Follette, Sr. - 25
 Others - 13

3rd ballot:
 Charles Evans Hughes - 949.5
 Theodore Roosevelt - 18.5
 Robert M. La Follette, Sr. - 3
 John W. Weeks - 3
 Others - 13

References
 

Theodore Roosevelt
Roosevelt, Theodore
Roosevelt, Theodore